is a Shinto shrine located in Higashiyama-ku, Kyoto, Japan. It was built in 1599 to commemorate Toyotomi Hideyoshi. It is the location of the first tamaya (a Shinto altar for ancestor worship) ever constructed, which was later destroyed by the Tokugawa clan.

History
This shrine is the official tomb and shrine of Toyotomi Hideyoshi, who died September 18, 1598 in Kyoto.

Nobles, priests, warriors, and townspeople gathered at the shrine to celebrate the anniversary of Hideyoshi's apotheosis with banquets, musical recitals, and boisterous festivity.  The shrine was closed by Tokugawa Ieyasu in June 1615 "to discourage these unseemly displays of loyalty to a man he had eclipsed."  

The Meiji Emperor directed that the shrine be restored in Keiō 4, the 6th day of the 6th month (April 28, 1868).  At that time, the shrine area was expanded slightly by encompassing a small parcel of land which had been part of the adjacent Hōkō-ji.

In 1897, the tercentenary of Hideyoshi was celebrated at this site.

Architecture
It is generally believed that the karamon gate was originally built for Hideyoshi's Fushimi castle in 1598. When the castle was dismantled in 1623, the gate was first moved to Nijō castle, and then to the Konchi-in in Nanzen-ji. It was finally relocated to Toyokuni shrine in 1876 after the Meiji Restoration.

Designated Cultural Properties

National Treasures of Japan

The karamon

Important Cultural Properties
Painted folding screen depicting Festivals of Toyokuni (豊国の祭り), by Kanō Naizen of the Kanō School
Vest garment decorated with gold Chrysanthemum motif
Three decorated Chinese-style chests
Iron lantern cage
Naginata blade Honebami ("Bone-eater"), unsigned, attributed to Awataguchi Yoshimitsu

Gallery

See also
Toyotomi Hideyoshi

Notes

Beppyo shrines

References

 Ponsonby-Fane, Richard A. B. (1956). Kyoto: The Old Capital of Japan, 794-1869. Kyoto: The Ponsonby Memorial Society.
 Berry, Mary Elizabeth.  (1982). Hideyoshi. Cambridge: Harvard University Press.   (cloth, 1982),  (paper, 1989)  (scholarly biography)
 Kirby, John B. (1962).  From Castle to Teahouse: Japanese Architecture of the Momoyama Period. Tokyo: Tuttle Publishing.   OCLC 512972

Religious buildings and structures completed in 1599
Shinto shrines in Kyoto
1599 establishments in Japan
National Treasures of Japan